Pseudactenodes is a genus of beetles in the family Buprestidae, containing the following species:

 Pseudactenodes chrysotis (Illiger, 1800)
 Pseudactenodes schmidti (Quedenfeldt, 1890)

References

Buprestidae genera